The 2018 Golden Movie Awards  is an annual African award ceremony that seeks to honour individuals for their outstanding performance in  movies they featured in as characters in the year under review. The ceremony was held at the  Movenpick Ambassador Hotel in Accra. 
It was a star-studded event at the Movenpick Ambassador Hotel, which hosted filmmakers from Ghana, Nigeria, Uganda, and Ivory Coast for the 2018 Golden Movie Awards Africa. This year’s edition was hosted by popular Nigerian comedian AY and actress Joselyn Dumas.

References

Golden Movie Awards